is a Japanese film released January 21, 2006 and directed by Takashi Koizumi.  It is based on the novel The Housekeeper and the Professor.

Background
In contrast to the original work, which is told from the perspective of the narrator, the film is shown from the perspective of a 29-year-old Root as he recounts his memories of the professor to a group of new pupils.  Though there are a few differences between the film and the original work (for example, the movie touches on the relationship between the professor and the widow while the book does not give much detail), the film is generally faithful to the original.

Cast 
Akira Terao as Professor
Eri Fukatsu as Kyoko
Takanari Saito as Root
Hidetaka Yoshioka as Teacher (Root after age 19)
Ruriko Asaoka as the widow

Staff 
Original story by: Yōko Ogawa (Published by Shinchosha)
Directed by: Takashi Koizumi
Written by: Takashi Koizumi
Produced by: Miyako Araki, Tsutomu Sakurai
Cinematography: Hiroyuki Kitazawa, Masaharu Ueda
Artwork: Ken Sakei
Sound: Benitani Sen'ichi
Lighting: Hideaki Yamakawa
Wardrobe: Kazuko Kurosawa 
Music by: Takashi Kako
Distributed by: Asmik Ace Entertainment

References

External links 
 

2006 films
2006 drama films
Japanese drama films
Films about mathematics
Films about educators
2000s Japanese-language films
Films based on Japanese novels
Films directed by Takashi Koizumi
2000s Japanese films